James Ellington (born December 5, 1943) is an American Republican politician. From 1988 to 2012 he served as member of the Mississippi House of Representatives from the 73rd District.

References

1943 births
Living people
Republican Party members of the Mississippi House of Representatives
Place of birth missing (living people)